Herschel Shmoikel Pinchas Yerucham Krustofsky, better known by his stage name Krusty the Clown (sometimes spelled as Krusty the Klown), is a recurring character on the animated television series The Simpsons. He is voiced by Dan Castellaneta. He is the long-time clown host of Bart and Lisa's favorite TV show, a combination of kiddie variety television hijinks and cartoons including The Itchy & Scratchy Show. Krusty is often portrayed as a cynical, burnt-out, addiction-riddled smoker who is made miserable by show business but continues on anyway. He has become one of the most frequently occurring characters outside the main Simpson family and has been the focus of several episodes, many of which also feature Sideshow Bob.

Krusty was created by cartoonist Matt Groening and partially inspired by Rusty Nails, a television clown from Groening's hometown of Portland, Oregon. He was designed to look like Homer Simpson with clown makeup, with the original idea being that Bart worships a television clown who was actually his own father in disguise. His voice is based on Bob Bell, who portrayed WGN-TV's Bozo the Clown. Krusty made his television debut on January 15, 1989, in the Tracey Ullman Show short "The Krusty the Clown Show".

Role in The Simpsons
Krusty the Clown, born Herschel Shmoikel Pinchas Yerucham Krustofsky, was born in the Lower East Side of Springfield and is the son of Rabbi Hyman Krustofsky. Very little is known about his mother, aside from her name being Rachel and that she died when Krusty was around thirteen. Hyman strongly opposed Krusty's wish to become a clown and make people laugh, believing that it would distract him from his religion, wanting the boy to go to yeshiva instead. However, Krusty performed slapstick comedy behind his father's back. One day, he was performing at a rabbis' convention when one joking rabbi squirted seltzer on him, washing off his clown makeup. When Rabbi Krustofsky found out, he disowned his son, and did not speak to him for 25 years. Krusty was later reconciled with his father with the assistance of Bart and Lisa Simpson. It was later revealed that Krusty did not have a Bar Mitzvah service, because Hyman feared he would violate the sanctity of the rites by "acting up." Krusty had two adult Bar Mitzvah ceremonies: a Hollywood gala which Krusty uses to stage a comeback after his show is cancelled, then a simple ceremony intended to reconnect with his father. After leaving the Lower East Side of Springfield, Krusty started his show biz career as a street mime in Tupelo, Mississippi (Elvis Presley's birthplace). Krusty later discovered that he has a daughter named Sophie with a female soldier named Erin. He had met Erin when she served as a soldier in the Gulf War and he was entertaining the troops. After spending the night together, he prevented her from assassinating Saddam Hussein to protect his Saddam-themed comedy act. After that Erin started hating clowns, and kept their daughter a secret from Krusty. Krusty and Sophie bonded over time, and while not a full-time father, he is known to keep up with her birthdays and to also make occasional in-show references to "my daughter."

Krusty has his own show on Channel 6 in Springfield: The Krusty the Clown Show, which is aimed towards a children's audience and has many followers, including Bart Simpson. Krusty has licensed the show to dozens of countries that produce localized versions, including Ireland, China, Jamaica, and Romania with the original version being the least popular. Krusty's show has gone through various phases: a clip from 1961 presents the show as a serious talk show featuring Krusty interviewing AFL–CIO president George Meany on the topic of collective bargaining agreements, while a clip from 1963 shows Krusty interviewing Robert Frost, then dumping a load of snow on the poet. The show later takes a different turn, featuring Ravi Shankar as a guest and having Krusty howl a drugged-out version of The Doors' "Break on Through (To the Other Side)" in 1973. By the 1980s, the show had devolved into a children's entertainment show, although in one episode Krusty provided updates on the 1982 Argentine invasion of the Falkland Islands. During the series, the Krusty the Clown Show is shown to be aimed almost entirely at children and features many characters, including Sideshow Mel, Mr. Teeny, Tina Ballerina, and Corporal Punishment. Sideshow Bob begins the series as Krusty's main sidekick. However, years of constant abuse lead to Bob framing Krusty for armed robbery, although Bob is eventually foiled by Bart. Bob is replaced by Sideshow Mel, who has remained loyal to Krusty despite being constantly abused by Krusty as well.

Krusty seems to retire from—and then get back into—show business repeatedly throughout his career. One of his retirements is almost made permanent due to just-paroled Sideshow Bob's latest scheme: wiring plastic explosives to a hypnotized Bart and sending him up on stage. When Krusty makes a tribute to Bob at the last minute, however, Bob has a change of heart and stops Bart from fulfilling his mission. Bob and Krusty later reconcile, with Krusty exclaiming that Bob's attempts at Krusty's life make his ratings shoot through the roof. This reconciliation remains for the rest of the series, as Bob abandons his attempts for revenge on Krusty in favor of targeting Bart exclusively.

Bart Simpson is one of Krusty's biggest fans. In the episode "Krusty Gets Busted" (Season 1, Episode 12) he declares, "I've based my entire life on Krusty's teachings," and sleeps in a room filled with Krusty merchandise. He exposes Sideshow Bob's attempted framing, helps Krusty return to the air with a comeback special, reigniting his career, and reunites Krusty with his estranged father. For his part, Krusty is usually grateful for Bart's assistance, but almost immediately forgets about it — presumably due to his excessive drinking and drug habits as well as his general conceitedness — and usually does not even remember his name the next time they encounter each other. One summer, Bart enthusiastically attends Kamp Krusty, largely because of the promise that he would get to spend his summer with Krusty. The camp turns out to be a disaster, with Krusty nowhere to be seen, as the camp is simply a franchise location to which Krusty has licensed his image. Bart keeps his hopes up by believing that Krusty will show up, but one day the camp director, Mr. Black, brings in Barney Gumble with clown makeup masquerading as Krusty. This pushes Bart over the edge. He decides that he is sick of Krusty's shoddy merchandise and takes over the camp. Krusty immediately visits the camp in hopes of ending the conflict and manages to appease Bart.

Krusty is a multimillionaire who has amassed his fortune mostly by licensing his name and image to a variety of substandard products and services, from Krusty alarm clocks to Krusty crowd control barriers. Many of these products are potentially dangerous, such as Krusty's brand of cereal, Krusty-O's, which in one episode boasts a jagged metal Krusty-O in each box. One of many lawsuits regarding these products is launched by Bart, who eats a jagged metal Krusty-O by mistake and has to have his appendix removed. The "Krusty Korporation," the company responsible for Krusty's licensing, has also launched a series of disastrous promotions and business ventures, such as sponsoring the 1984 Summer Olympics with a rigged promotion that backfires when the Soviet Union boycotts the games, causing Krusty to lose $44 million. In the TV series and comic books, Krusty is also the mascot and owner of the restaurant Krusty Burger. He has been shut down by the health board many times for everything from overworking employees to stapling together half-eaten burgers to make new ones, as well as using beef infected with mad cow disease to save money. Krusty wastes money almost as fast as he earns it: lighting his cigarettes with hundred-dollar bills, eating condor-egg omelettes, spending huge sums on pornographic magazines and call girls, and losing a fortune gambling on everything from horse races to operas and betting against the Harlem Globetrotters.

Krusty is a hard-living entertainment veteran, sometimes depicted as a jaded, burned-out has-been, who has been down and out several times and remains addicted to gambling, cigarettes, alcohol, Percodan, Pepto-Bismol, and Xanax. He instantly becomes depressed as soon as the cameras stop rolling; Marge states in "The Sweetest Apu" that, "off camera, he's a desperately unhappy man." Krusty appears to have used cocaine, one time emerging from a restaurant bathroom with white powder under his nose; however, he explains that he was simply researching a part for a film in which he played himself. In his book Planet Simpson, author Chris Turner describes Krusty as "the wizened veteran, the total pro" who lives the celebrity life. He is miserable but he needs his celebrity status. In "Bart the Fink," Bart inadvertently reports Krusty for tax fraud to the Internal Revenue Service and, as a result, Krusty loses most of his money. Bart soon discovers that Krusty has faked his death and is living as Rory B. Bellows on a boat. Krusty declares that he is finished with the life of a celebrity and is unconvinced when Bart reminds him of his fans and his entourage. Finally, Bart tells Krusty that leaving show business would mean losing his celebrity status, which convinces Krusty to return. Krusty has been described as "the consummate showman who can't bear the possibility of not being on the air and not entertaining people."

In the fourteenth season, Bart convinces Krusty to run for Congress so that Krusty can introduce an airline rerouting bill and stop planes from flying over the Simpsons' house. Krusty agrees and runs on the Republican ticket. Although his campaign starts off badly, Lisa suggests that he try connecting with regular families. He does so, resulting in a landslide victory. Krusty's term starts off badly, as he is completely ignored by his new, more politically savvy colleagues. With the help of the Simpsons and an influential doorman, however, Krusty succeeds in passing his bill.

His body features include a third nipple, a veal-shaped birthmark, and a scar on his chest as a result of having a pacemaker inserted into his heart after suffering from a heart attack on the air in 1986.

Characterization

Creation

Krusty first appeared in "The Krusty the Clown Show", one of the Simpsons shorts from The Tracey Ullman Show that first aired on January 15, 1989. The character was partially inspired by TV clown "Rusty Nails" whom The Simpsons creator Matt Groening and director Brad Bird watched as children while growing up in Portland, Oregon. Groening describes Rusty Nails as being a sweet clown whose show sometimes had a Christian message, but whose name scared Groening. Dan Castellaneta based his voice characterization on Chicago television's Bob Bell who had a very raspy voice and portrayed WGN-TV's Bozo the Clown from 1960 to 1984. Krusty has been compared to an earlier incarnation named "Flunky the Late Night viewer mail clown" who had appeared on Late Night with David Letterman. Jeff Martin, a writer on Letterman’s show, created and played the character. Martin also went on to become a writer on The Simpsons writing episodes that included Krusty.

Many events in Krusty's life parallel those of comedian Jerry Lewis, including his Jewish background, addiction to Percodan, hosting of telethons, and appearance in The Jazz Singer (Ford Startime). When asked, Groening has simply noted that "[Simpsons] characters are collaborations between the writers, animators, and actors" without specifically confirming or denying the association.

Krusty's appearance and design is essentially that of Homer Simpson with clown makeup. Groening said that "The satirical conceit that I was going for at the time was that The Simpsons was about a kid who had no respect for his father, but worshipped a clown who looked exactly like his father", a theme which became less important as the show developed. One concept initially saw Krusty being revealed as Homer's secret identity but the idea was dropped for being too complex and because the writers were too busy developing the series. There are two instances of the one assuming the identity of the other. In a (non-canonical) Butterfinger commercial depicting a contest for $50,000 to find out who stole Bart's Butterfinger, a captured Homer appears to be the culprit until Maggie pulls off a mask, revealing Krusty. In the episode "Homie the Clown", Homer goes to Clown College and dresses up as—and is confused with—Krusty. Krusty was originally just a normal man wearing clown makeup, but David Silverman noted that "at some point, we decided he looked [like a clown] all the time". The producers had long discussions about whether or not Krusty would always remain in his clown makeup but eventually decided that it did not matter. The writers had tried showing Krusty's real face a few times in early episodes, but decided that it did not look right, although his real face was seen in "Krusty Gets Busted" and "Like Father, Like Clown". Later episodes made jokes about Krusty's face. In "Homer's Triple Bypass", Krusty reveals that his "grotesque appearance" is the result of multiple heart attacks. Homer remarks that he seems fine, and Krusty replies, "This ain't makeup." In "Bart the Fink", he abandons an idea to sail away with a new identity and swims towards shore, leaving a trail of yellow makeup in his wake and his natural white face underneath. On shore, he shakes off his black hair, revealing his natural green clown hair, and removes his normal-looking fake nose to reveal his natural red bulbous clown nose underneath.

Development

The third season episode "Like Father, Like Clown" is the first to establish that Krusty is Jewish. Krusty's religion had not been part of the original concept, and the idea came from Jay Kogen. The episode is a parody of The Jazz Singer, which is about a son with a strict religious upbringing who defies his father to become an entertainer. In order to make "Like Father, Like Clown" a full parody of The Jazz Singer, the decision was made to make Krusty Jewish and have his father be a Rabbi. Krusty's real last name, Krustofsky, was pitched by Al Jean. Krusty's father, Rabbi Hyman Krustofsky was played by Jackie Mason, who won a Primetime Emmy Award for Outstanding Voice-Over Performance for the episode. It was established in "Krusty Gets Busted" that Krusty is illiterate. This was shown in subsequent episodes like "Itchy & Scratchy & Marge" but the trait was dropped after the first few seasons because it was hard for the writers to write for an illiterate character.

Krusty's design has undergone several subtle changes since the early years. For the episode "Homie the Clown", Krusty's design was permanently enhanced and he was given a different shaped mouth muzzle and permanent bags under his eyes in order to distinguish him from Homer. In the episode "Lisa's Wedding", which is set fifteen years in the future, Krusty's design was significantly altered to make him look considerably older and was based on Groucho Marx.

Krusty is a favorite character of several of the original writers, many of whom related themselves to him and wanted to write the Krusty-focused episodes. Krusty was used as a chance for show business jokes and thus many of Krusty's experiences and anecdotes are based on real experiences and stories heard by the writers. He was a particular favorite of Brad Bird, who directed the first two Krusty episodes and always tried to animate a scene in every Krusty episode.

In 1992, Matt Groening and James L. Brooks began planning a live-action spin-off from The Simpsons that revolved around Krusty and would star Dan Castellaneta as Krusty. They pitched the series in 1994. Groening and Michael Weithorn wrote a pilot script where Krusty moved to Los Angeles and got his own talk show. A recurring joke throughout the script was that Krusty lived in a house on wooden stilts which were continuously being gnawed by beavers. Eventually, the contract negotiations fell apart and Groening decided to stop work on the project.

Prior to Groening's live-action pitch, Simpsons showrunners Al Jean and Mike Reiss planned an animated Krusty spin-off in which he would be a single father in New York, and supporting characters would include a prickly make-up lady and a boss resembling Ted Turner. This unsuccessful pitch was later reworked into the animated series The Critic.

Promotion and reception
Krusty has been included in many Simpsons publications, toys and other merchandise. Krusty-themed merchandise includes dolls, posters, figurines, Jack-in-the-boxes, Pint glasses, bobblehead dolls, costumes, and clothing such as T-shirts. Playmates Toys has made a talking evil Krusty doll, based on the one that appeared in "Treehouse of Horror III". In 1992, Acclaim Entertainment released the video game Krusty's Fun House for PC and home consoles. Krusty was made into an action figure, and several different versions were included as part of the World of Springfield toy line. The first, which shows Krusty in his normal clown attire with several Krusty products, was released in 2000 as part of "wave one". The second, released in 2002 as part of "wave nine", is called "busted Krusty" and shows him in a prison and without his clown makeup, as he was seen in "Krusty Gets Busted". The third was released in 2003 as part of "wave thirteen" and was called "Tuxedo Krusty". Several Krusty themed play sets were also released, including a Krusty-Lu Studios and Krusty Burger playset, both released in 2001. Krusty appears as a playable character in the toys-to-life video game Lego Dimensions, released via a "Fun Pack" packaged with a Clown Bike accessory in November 2015. In game, his only ability is being able to spray water and all his voice lines are archive audio from Dan Castellaneta.

In The Simpsons Ride, a simulator ride opened at Universal Studios Florida and Universal Studios Hollywood in May 2008, Krusty builds and opens a cartoon theme park called Krustyland. Sideshow Bob makes an appearance and tries to murder the Simpson family. In July 2007, convenience store chain 7-Eleven converted eleven of its stores in the United States and one in Canada into Kwik-E-Marts to celebrate the release of The Simpsons Movie. Amongst the products sold were "Krusty-O's", which were made by Malt-O-Meal. In 2015, Krusty had its first merchandise experience during the AW15 influence.

In 2004, Dan Castellaneta won a Primetime Emmy Award for Outstanding Voice-Over Performance in "Today I Am a Clown", an episode that heavily features Krusty. Several episodes featuring Krusty have been very well received. In 2007, Vanity Fair named "Krusty Gets Kancelled" as the ninth best episode of The Simpsons. John Ortved felt, "This is Krusty's best episode – better than the reunion with his father, or the Bar Mitzvah episode, which won an Emmy much later on. The incorporation of guest stars as themselves is topnotch, and we get to see the really dark side of Krusty's flailing showbiz career. Hollywood, television, celebrities, and fans are all beautifully skewered here." Matt Groening cites "Krusty Gets Busted" as his ninth favorite episode and has said that he particularly loves Castellaneta's voice work. Groening claims that he has to leave the room every time Castellaneta records as Krusty for fear of ruining the take. Star News Online named "Krusty the Clown's hatred of children", Kamp Krusty, and Krusty's line "All these rules, I feel like I'm in a strip club" as some of the four hundred reasons why they loved The Simpsons. The Observer listed two Krusty products, "Krusty's Non-Toxic Kologne" and "Krusty's home pregnancy kit", as part of their list of the three hundred reasons why they loved the show.

In 2015, The A.V. Club stated that Krusty has "arguably the most pathos of any Simpsons character not named Moe Szyslak". In 2021, Meghan Markle reflected on her old memorable haircut being compared to Krusty the Clown at The Ellen DeGeneres Show.

References

Bibliography

External links

 Krusty the Clown on IMDb

The Simpsons characters
Television characters introduced in 1989
Fictional actors
Fictional American Jews
Fictional alcohol abusers
Fictional businesspeople
Fictional clowns
Fictional cocaine users
Fictional painkiller addicts
Fictional Republicans (United States)
Fictional television personalities
Animated human characters
Male characters in animated series
Fictional Polish Jews
Characters created by Matt Groening
Fictional gamblers